Sasihithlu beach also known as Daibittil beach is located in Sasihithlu village, which is situated north of Mangalore city, in the state of Karnataka, in India. Sasihithlu Beach is situated approximately 6 km to the west of NH 66, and surrounded by the backwaters of the Pavanje and Shambhavi rivers. The two rivers meet at the beach. It is close to Mukka, one of the fastest developing localities of Mangalore. This beach hosted the Indian Open of Surfing in 2016 and 2017.

Educational Institutions nearby
National Institute of Technology Karnataka, Surathkal, Mangalore
Srinivas Institute of Medical Sciences and Research Centre, Mukka, Mangalore
Srinivas Institute of Dental Sciences, Mukka, Mangalore
Srinivas University College of Engineering & Technology (SUCET), Mukka, Mangalore

Hospitals nearby
Srinivas Hospital, Mukka, Mangalore
Padmavathi Hospital, Surathkal, Mangalore
Venus Hospital, Surathkal, Mangalore
Atharva Hospital, Surathkal, Mangalore

Accessibility 
Sasihithlu Beach is well connected by public transport. There are several city buses(2,2A) from the main bus stop in statebank and other parts of the city. One can also take the non-express service buses that give a stop for Sasihithlu Beach right at Mukka. Once off the bus, one can take auto to reach. 

Distance from:
National Institute of Technology Karnataka, Surathkal, Mangalore - 8 km
Panambur Beach,  Mangalore - 15 km
New Mangalore Port, Mangalore- 17 km
Tannirbhavi Beach, Mangalore- 22 km
Pumpwell, Mangalore - 27 km
Pilikula Nisargadhama, Mangalore - 29 km
Infosys DC, Mudipu, Mangalore - 44 km
Manipal - 47 km
Dharmasthala - 83 km
Kukke Subramanya Temple - 125 km
Murdeshwar - 141 km
Kannur, Kerala - 162 km
Gokarna, Karnataka - 217 km
Mysuru - 274 km
Hubli - 343 km
Panaji, Goa - 351 km
Bengaluru - 370 km

Nearest Railway Stations:
Surathkal railway station, Surathkal, Mangalore - 10 km
Mangalore Central railway station, Hampankatta, Mangalore - 27 km
Mangalore Junction railway station, Padil, Mangalore - 28 km

Nearest Airport:
 Mangalore International Airport (India) - 26 km

References

Beaches of Mangalore